Sweden is competed at the 2016 Summer Paralympics in Rio de Janeiro, Brazil, from 7 September to 18 September 2016. They won ten medals; one gold, four silver and five bronze.

Medalists

Administration 
At 7 September 2015, one year before the opening ceremony, the Swedish Parasports Federation nominated the first athletes for the Swedish team.

Disability classifications

Every participant at the Paralympics has their disability grouped into one of five disability categories; amputation, the condition may be congenital or sustained through injury or illness; cerebral palsy; wheelchair athletes, there is often overlap between this and other categories; visual impairment, including blindness; Les autres, any physical disability that does not fall strictly under one of the other categories, for example dwarfism or multiple sclerosis. Each Paralympic sport then has its own classifications, dependent upon the specific physical demands of competition. Events are given a code, made of numbers and letters, describing the type of event and classification of the athletes competing. Some sports, such as athletics, divide athletes by both the category and severity of their disabilities, other sports, for example swimming, group competitors from different categories together, the only separation being based on the severity of the disability.

Archery

|-
|align=left|Zandra Reppe
|align=left|Women's individual compound open
|652
|5
|
|L 135–142
|colspan=3|Did not advance
|9
|}

Athletics

Boccia

Canoe sprint

Helene Ripa, paralympic gold and silver medallist in cross-country skiing in the 2014 Winter Paralympics qualified for her first summer paralympic games in canoe sprint.

Cycling

With one pathway for qualification being one highest ranked NPCs on the UCI Para-Cycling male and female Nations Ranking Lists on 31 December 2014, Sweden qualified for the 2016 Summer Paralympics in Rio, assuming they continued to meet all other eligibility requirements. In total, Sweden secured four quota places in road cycling.

Road

Equestrian
The country earned an additional individual slot via the Para Equestrian Individual Ranking List Allocation method following the suspension of Russia, and France Finland not using one of their allocated spots.

Goalball

Summary

Key:

Men's tournament
The men's national team qualified after finishing in third place at the 2015 IBSA World Games in Seoul. Sweden's men enter the tournament ranked 13th in the world.

Squad

Preliminary round

Quarterfinal

Semifinal

Bronze medal match

Judo

Sweden have qualified one judoka for the Games.

Paratriathlon

Sailing

One pathway for qualifying for Rio involved having a boat have top seven finish at the 2015 Combined World Championships in a medal event where the country had nor already qualified through via the 2014 IFDS Sailing World Championships.  Sweden qualified for the 2016 Games under this criteria in the 2.4m event with a fifteenth-place finish overall and the fifth country who had not qualified via the 2014 Championships.  The boat was crewed by Fia Fjelddahl.

Shooting 

The first opportunity to qualify for shooting at the Rio Games took place at the 2014 IPC Shooting World Championships in Suhl. Shooters earned spots for their NPC.  Sweden earned a qualifying spot at this event in the R1 – 10m Air Rifle standing men SH1 event as a result of Jonas Jakobsson winning a gold medal. Jakobsson set a new European record of during qualifyingin the R1 event. Sweden qualified another shooter in the R7 – 50m rifle 3 positions Men SH1 event after Jakobsson won a gold medal in this event. Joackim Norberg earned the country another spot in the P1 – 10m Air Pistol Men SH1 event.

The third opportunity for direct qualification for shooters to the Rio Paralympics took place at the 2015 IPC Shooting World Cup in Sydney, Australia.  At this competition, Ellinor Axelsson Vaughn earned a qualifying spot for their country in the R5- Mixed 10m Air Rifle Prone SH2 event. Håkan Gustafsson earned a second spot for Sweden at this competition in the R7- Men's 50m Rifle 3 Positions  event. Lotta Helsinger claimed a third spot for Rio at this competition in the R8- Women’s50m Rifle 3 Positions event.

The last direct qualifying event for Rio in shooting took place at the 2015 IPC Shooting World Cup in Fort Benning in November. Philip Jönsson earned a qualifying spot for their country at this competition in the R4 Mixed 10m Air Rifle Standing SH2 event.

Swimming

Men

Women

Legend: Q=Qualified; ER=European record; NR=National record

Table tennis

Men

Women

Wheelchair rugby

Summary

Key:

Sweden qualified by reaching the final of the 2015 International Wheelchair Rugby Federation European Championship.

 Team competition – one team of 12 players

Roster
The following is the Sweden roster in the wheelchair rugby tournament of the 2016 Summer Paralympics.

Preliminary round

Fifth place Match

Wheelchair tennis

Stefan Olsson and Dan Wallin have been selected by Sweden's Paralympic Committee. Stefan Olsson qualified via the standard qualification route, while Dan Wallin qualified via a Doubles World Ranking Allocation place.

See also
Sweden at the 2016 Summer Olympics

References

Nations at the 2016 Summer Paralympics
2016
2016 in Swedish sport